Adrian Hill (born in Washington, D.C.) is an American football official  in the National Football League (NFL) since the 2010 NFL season, wearing uniform number 29.

Career
Hill was an official in Conference USA, where he worked at the referee position. In 2007, Hill worked in the now-defunct NFL Europe league as a line judge.

Hill was hired by the NFL in 2010 as a line judge, and was promoted to referee with the start of the 2019 NFL season following the retirements of Pete Morelli and Walt Coleman. He worked as a line judge, side judge, and field judge before being promoted to referee, the seventh African-American to receive this honor.

Hill made unwanted headlines during a January 3, 2021 game when he called a "roughing-the-passer" penalty against Detroit Lions safety Tracy Walker after he sacked Kirk Cousins of the Minnesota Vikings on a 4th and goal play. The sack, which would have given the Lions the ball, appeared to be routine as the Lions players started to celebrate before realizing the penalty flag was against them. Cousins told Walker "I don't necessarily agree with that call, but I'll take it" as players on both sides of the field looked befuddled about the call. The Vikings would score a touchdown two plays later and go on to win the game 37-35. Both social media and mainstream media outlets covered the call with headlines such as "Tracy Walker’s phantom personal foul penalty causes uprising on social media" (Detroit Sports Nation), "NFL fans could not believe the horrendous, game-changing roughing call from Lions-Vikings" (USA Today), "Detroit Lions robbed by one of the worst calls ever in game vs. Minnesota Vikings" (Detroit Free Press), "Ridiculous roughing call on Kirk Cousins sack sets up Vikings' game-winning TD" (Yahoo Sports), "Lions flagged for roughing passer against Vikings on simple sack, befuddles fans" (Fox News) and "Worst Call in NFL History Aids Vikings in 37-35 Win against Lions" (Sports Illustrated). Though it seemed to be a blown call, Hill explained it as a clear-cut penalty in a post-game interview saying “By rule, one of the categories for roughing-the-passer is full body weight, where the tackler lands with his full body weight on the quarterback. That’s the category this play fell into.”

2022 Crew 

 R: Adrian Hill
 U: Roy Ellison
 DJ: David Oliver
 LJ: Kevin Codey
 FJ: Mearl Robinson
 SJ: Jim Quirk
 BJ: Keith Ferguson
 RO: Roddy Ames
 RA: Joe Wollan

Personal life
Hill resides in Bowie, Maryland. Outside of the NFL, Hill is an aerospace software engineer at the Johns Hopkins Applied Physics Laboratory (APL) Space Exploration Sector. He is the brother of Seattle radio host, Steve "The Thrill" Hill of the KISW 99.9 radio show The Mens Room.

References

Living people
African-American sports officials
National Football League officials
Year of birth missing (living people)
University at Buffalo alumni
21st-century African-American people